The Winnipeg Foundation is a registered charity and community foundation based in Winnipeg, Manitoba, Canada. Established in 1921, it is the oldest community foundation in Canada.

The Foundation is dedicated primarily to the social improvement of Winnipeg. It pools and permanently invests gifts from donors to support the local charitable sector, through grants in a broad range of areas, including; community service, education and employment, health, environment, heritage, arts and culture, and recreation.

In 2021, the Winnipeg Foundation made $84.9 million in grants to charitable organizations in Winnipeg. In 2020, it received over $187 million in gifts and distributed $73 million to approximately 1,000 charitable organizations.

History

The Winnipeg Foundation was founded in 1921 with a gift of $100,000 from local businessman and banker, William Forbes Alloway. Founding board members included Justice Robert Maxwell Dennistoun, Chief Justice Thomas Graham Mathers, Archdeacon R.B. McElheran, and Hugh John MacDonald. In 2001, the Foundation experienced an unprecedented gift when it received a $100 million donation—at the time it was the largest gift ever made to a Canadian community foundation - from Randall Moffat and his family. Moffat is the former president of Moffat Communications.

In 2003, The Winnipeg Foundation made its largest grant to date ($6 million) to the Canadian Museum for Human Rights. In 2012, the Foundation surpassed $300 million in total cumulative grants. In 2014, the Foundation made $22.9 million in grants to 860 charitable organizations. In 2020, it received over $187 million in gifts and distributed $73 million to approximately 1,000 charitable organizations.

References

External links
 The Winnipeg Foundation
 Canada Revenue Agency registered charity information database: The Winnipeg Foundation

1921 establishments in Manitoba
Charities based in Canada
Foundations based in Canada
Organizations based in Winnipeg
Community foundations